Smedberg may refer to:

People
 Martin Smedberg, Swedish football midfielder

Education
 T.R. Smedberg Middle School, Sacramento, California